In music and musical analysis, a subsidiary chord is an elaboration of a principal harmonic chord in a chord progression.

If the principal chord (X) is partially replaced by the subsidiary (Y), there are three possible positions - beginning, middle, and end - for the subsidiary:
X–Ya
Y–X
X–Y–X

For example, a subsidiary chord in a modulation.

A subsidiary chord may be a chord with related function and/or sharing pitches, for example in E major, Cm (C-E-G) as a subsidiary for E (E-G-B), which share two of three pitches and are related as tonic parallel (vi) and tonic (I).

See also
Parallel key
Primary triad

References

Further reading
Van der Merwe (2005), p. 428.

Chords